Václav Tikal (24 December 1906 in Ptetin village, Plzeň Region  – 26 November 1965 in Prague) was a Czechoslovak surrealist painter and ceramist.

References

1906 births
1965 deaths
Czechoslovak sculptors
Czechoslovak painters